Us Alone is the seventh studio album by Canadian singer-songwriter Hayden, released February 5, 2013 on Arts & Crafts.

Hayden has previously released all of his albums in Canada on his own Hardwood Records label, but he announced in November 2012 that he had signed to Arts & Crafts.

Singer-songwriter Lou Canon, Hayden's sister-in-law, appears as a duet vocalist on the track "Blurry Nights".

The album was named a longlisted nominee for the 2013 Polaris Music Prize on June 13, 2013. The album was a shortlisted nominee for the Juno Award for Adult Alternative Album of the Year at the Juno Awards of 2014.

Track listing

References 

Hayden (musician) albums
2013 albums
Arts & Crafts Productions albums